ICBT Campus also known as International College of Business and Technology, popularly known as the ICBT Campus is a BOI-approved project formed to conduct internationally recognised educational programs in association with educational institutes. It is one of the largest and most prominent tertiary education providers in Sri Lanka. It delivers certificate, diplomas, pre-university programs, undergraduate programs, masters level programs including doctorate level programs in association with some of the Universities and educational service providers in UK, Australia, Thailand, India and Sweden. The institution has formed a partnership with the Cardiff Metropolitan University.

History 
ICBT was founded in 2000 as a Board of Investment of Sri Lanka project with the objective of providing foreign education programs in Sri Lanka, in association with universities and educational service providers around the world.

ICBT Campus has eight branches in Sri Lanka; the main campus is situated in Bambalapitiya, Colombo-04 with subsidiary branches in Gampaha, Nugegoda, Kurunegala, Kandy, Matara, Galle, Jaffna and Batticaloa.

References 

Educational institutions established in 2000
2000 establishments in Sri Lanka
Business schools in Sri Lanka
Universities in Sri Lanka